"Happy Birthday Dear Heartache" is a song written by Archie Jordan and Mack David, and recorded by American country music artist Barbara Mandrell. It was released in January 1984 as the first single from the album Clean Cut.  The song reached number 3 on the Billboard Hot Country Singles & Tracks chart.

Content
The song is a bitter observance of the one-year anniversary of a breakup, set in terms of a birthday celebration. Instead of being in a celebratory mood, however, the woman observes "how big you've (the heartbreak) has grown" and that the guests of honor are  "the blues, the memories and the tears." The breakup is so bitter that she observes at the end, "Same time, same place next year."

Charts

Weekly charts

Year-end charts

References

Songs about heartache
1984 singles
Barbara Mandrell songs
Songs with lyrics by Mack David
Songs written by Archie Jordan
Song recordings produced by Tom Collins (record producer)
MCA Records singles
1984 songs